Andreas Pedersen Bredahl (born 13 March 2003) is a Danish football player. He plays for Vejle Boldklub.

Club career
He made his Danish Superliga debut for FC Nordsjælland on 17 July 2020 in a game against FC Midtjylland.

After leaving Nordsjælland, as his contract came to an end, it was confirmed on 20 June 2022, that Bredahl had signed a contract until June 2025 with newly relegated Danish 1st Division club Vejle Boldklub.

References

External links
 

2003 births
Living people
Danish men's footballers
Denmark youth international footballers
Association football forwards
FC Nordsjælland players
Vejle Boldklub players
Danish Superliga players